Kristian Ghedina (born 20 November 1969) is an Italian alpine skiing coach and former competitive racer. His 13 victories are the second most by an Italian downhill specialist in World Cup history: the first is Dominik Paris with 21 victories. He is currently an auto racer.

Biography
Ghedina was born in Cortina d'Ampezzo in the province of Belluno, and his mother tongue is Ladin. He studied in Innsbruck and made his World Cup debut in 1989. The following year, after a series of initial podiums and a ruinous fall, he won the last two downhills of the season. He won the silver medal in the Combined race of the 1991 World Championships at Saalbach, Austria; however, the following year he suffered a serious car crash.

Ghedina returned to his best form only in 1995, remaining among the best specialists in the speed disciplines until 2001, when he obtained the last of his 13 World Cup victories (12 Downhills and one Super-G, with a total of 33 podiums). He won also another silver medal at the 1996 and a bronze in the 1997 championships, both in downhill. After his last World Cup victory he kept on racing for another 5 seasons, reaching 15 top ten results, two of them podiums.

His probably most remarkable performance he gave on 24 January 2004 at the Hahnenkamm race in Kitzbühel: on the last jump, approaching the finish line at a speed of 137,6 km/h, he produced a straddle in the air ("spread eagle") which amazed spectators and TV commentators; nevertheless he gained a temporary lead in the race, which he finished sixth in the end.

Ghedina retired from ski racing following the 2006 season. He has raced a BMW in the Italian Superturismo Championship and, driving a Lola, in the Formula 3000 International Masters. In 2012 he started working with the Croatian national ski team, advising the team on the alpine speed disciplines.

World Cup results

Podium
13 wins (12 DH, 1 SG)
33 podiums (29 DH, 4 SG)

Overall

See also
 Italian skiers who closed in top 10 in overall World Cup

References

External links

ghedina.com – personal site – 
YouTube.com – victory (and crash) at Wengen – 1997-01-18
YouTube.com – spread eagle at Kitzbühel – 2004-01-24

1969 births
Living people
Sportspeople from the Province of Belluno
Italian male alpine skiers
Alpine skiers at the 1992 Winter Olympics
Alpine skiers at the 1994 Winter Olympics
Alpine skiers at the 1998 Winter Olympics
Alpine skiers at the 2002 Winter Olympics
Alpine skiers at the 2006 Winter Olympics
Olympic alpine skiers of Italy
Italian racing drivers
Porsche Supercup drivers
Superstars Series drivers
Ladin people
Alpine skiers of Fiamme Gialle
Italian alpine skiing coaches